The 2018–19 Cádiz CF season was the club's 109th season in existence and its third consecutive season in the second division of Spanish football. In addition to the domestic league, Cádiz participated in this season's edition of the Copa del Rey. The season covered the period from 1 July 2018 to 30 June 2019.

Players

First-team squad

Reserve team

Out on loan

Pre-season and friendlies

Competitions

Overview

Segunda División

League table

Results summary

Results by round

Matches
The league fixtures were announced on 24 July 2018.

Copa del Rey

Statistics

Goalscorers

References

External links

Cádiz CF seasons
Cádiz